Ebenezer Landells (Newcastle 1808 – 1 October 1860 London) was a British wood-engraver, illustrator, and magazine proprietor.

Life
Born in Newcastle, Landells was apprenticed to the wood-engraver Thomas Bewick.  
In 1829 he moved to London, and before long managed to start his own engraving workshop.  After attempting a short-lived fashion journal, Cosmorama, he joined with the journalist Henry Mayhew and the printer William Last to found Punch in 1841. Initial difficulties forced Landells to sell his one-third share to the publishers Bradbury & Evans: after the new owners replaced Landells with Joseph Swain as engraving chief, Landells responded with a pamphlet A Word with Punch (1847).

Herbert Ingram consulted Landells about launching his illustrated weekly Illustrated London News in 1842: after a commission to sketch Victoria's first visit to Scotland that year, Landells became the paper's first artist correspondent and continued to supply prints for the newspaper until his death.

Landells was also involved in several other magazines: the less successful Illuminated Magazine (1843–35), Great Gun (1844, in imitation of Punch), the Lady's Newspaper (1847–63, after which incorporated in the Queen), Diogenes (1853, another attempt to imitate Punch), and the Illustrated Inventor. Responding to the growth in the children's book market, he wrote and illustrated several books for children: Boy's Own Toy-Maker (1858), Girl's Own Toy-Maker (1859), and Illustrated Paper Model Maker (1860).

Landells 

He died at Victoria Grove, West Brompton, in south-west London on 1 October 1860 and was buried on the western side of Highgate Cemetery. The grave (no.420) no longer has a headstone or any memorial.

Landells Road in London's East Dulwich is purported to be named after him.

Family
He was married, on 9 January 1832, at New St. Pancras Church, London, to Anne, eldest daughter of Robert McLegan of London. His son, Robert Thomas Landells, was also an illustrator, and married the daughter of composer George Rodwell.

References 

Attribution

External links

Parlour Magic by Ebenezer Landells is freely accessible with full page images and full text searching in the University of Florida Digital Collections
The Boy's Own Toy-maker: a Practical Illustrated Guide to the Useful Employment of Leisure Hours by Ebenezer Landells is freely accessible with full page images and full text searching in the University of Florida Digital Collections

1808 births
1860 deaths
Burials at Highgate Cemetery
Artists from Newcastle upon Tyne
English engravers
English illustrators
British magazine founders